Leonel Marshall Borges Jr. (born September 25, 1979) is a Cuban professional volleyball player. He is an outside hitter, and is well known for his outstanding vertical jump. He played for M. Roma Volley and Pallavolo Piacenza in Italy and currently plays for LPR Piacenza where he wears number 7. He was the youngest member of the Cuban men's indoor volleyball team at the 2000 Olympics, which placed seventh. 
He is son of retired Cuban volleyball player Leonel Marshall Sr. who competed in the 1976 Summer Olympics and in the 1980 Summer Olympics.

Achievements

Honors
CEV Cup runner up with Pallavolo Piacenza: 2004, 2007
CEV Top Teams Cup winner with Pallavolo Piacenza: 2006
Italian Championship  winner with Pallavolo Piacenza: 2009
Italian Championship  runner up with Pallavolo Piacenza: 2004, 2007
Turkish Championship winner with Fenerbahçe: 2010–11, 2011–12
Turkish Volleyball Cup winner  with Fenerbahçe: 2011-12
Turkish Volleyball Super Cup winner with Fenerbahçe: 2011-12
CEV Challenge Cup winner with Fenerbahçe: 2013-14

Individual
 World League 2001: "Best service"
 Cuban sports 2002: "Talented player award"
 CEV Cup 2005–06: "MVP"
 Turkey League 2010–11: "MVP"
 Turkey League 2010–11: "Best receiver" 
 Turkey League 2013–14: "Best receiver" 
 Turkey League 2014–15: "Best receiver"

Notes

References

External links
 
 
 

1979 births
Living people
Cuban men's volleyball players
Fenerbahçe volleyballers
Sporting CP volleyball players
Volleyball players at the 2000 Summer Olympics
Olympic volleyball players of Cuba
American people of Cuban descent